Ursula Heinrich is a West German retired slalom canoeist who competed in the early 1970s. She won a silver medal in the K-1 team event at the 1971 ICF Canoe Slalom World Championships in Meran.

References

German female canoeists
Living people
Year of birth missing (living people)
Medalists at the ICF Canoe Slalom World Championships